Dane County Regional Airport (DCRA) , also known as Truax Field, is a civil-military airport located  northeast of downtown Madison, Wisconsin. In the Federal Aviation Administration (FAA) National Plan of Integrated Airport Systems for 2023–2027, it is one of 2 airports in Wisconsin that is categorized as a small-hub primary commercial service facility; the other is Appleton International Airport. It is the second busiest of eight commercial airports in Wisconsin in terms of passengers served, after Milwaukee Mitchell International Airport.

History
In 1927, the City of Madison purchased 290 acres of land for $35,380. Previously a cabbage patch for a nearby sauerkraut factory, the newly-acquired land would later become the present-day home of the Dane County Regional Airport. In January 1936, the city council voted to accept a Works Progress Administration grant for the construction of four runways and an airplane hangar. Additional grants financed the terminal and administrative building as well as electric floodlights. The development price tag was $1 million – 10% paid by the city and the remainder by the federal government (MSN Airport, 2012). In September 1938, Barnstormer Howard Morey of Chicago; Edgar Quinn; and J.J. McMannamy organized the Madison Airways Corporation.

The airport was renamed Truax Field and activated as a U.S. Army Air Corps airfield in June 1942 during World War II.  During the war, it was used by the Army Air Corps Eastern Technical Training Center, a major school operating at Truax AAF for training radio operators and mechanics, and the airport later expanded to training in radar operations, control tower operations, and other communications fields for the Army Airways Communication Service.  A unit established in 1943 trained radio operators and mechanics on B-29 Superfortress communications equipment.  The host unit on the airfield was the 334th (later 3508th) Army Air Corps Base Unit.  On September 17, 1945, the airfield's mission was changed to that of a separation center and it was closed as an active AAF airfield on November 30, 1945.

Conveyed to local civil authorities, the Madison Municipal Airport became the home to the 1st Battalion 147th Aviation Regiment. The 1-147th operates the UH-60M Blackhawk Helicopter and has deployed in support of Operation Enduring Freedom. The airport is also home to the Wisconsin Air National Guard and its present-day 115th Fighter Wing (115 FW), an Air National Guard fighter wing operationally gained by the Air Combat Command (ACC). Today, the Air National Guard's F-16 Fighting Falcon still operates at the base. The 115th Fighter Wing is one of the 14 operational air defense units responsible for air defense of the eastern continental United States.

On December 15, 1966, a 31,000 square foot terminal building opened on the west side of the airfield at a cost of $2.36 million. The first scheduled jets were Northwest Orient 727s in 1965. In 1986, the airport tripled in size with a $12 million project that expanded the terminal from 32,000 square feet to 90,000 square feet, adding a second-level concourse with six boarding bridges.

In 2006, the airport completed a $68 million expansion that doubled the size of the terminal, built in a Frank Lloyd Wright-influenced prairie style designed by the Architectural Alliance based in Minneapolis. The new terminal accommodates 13 gates with jetways, WiFi, additional restaurant and retail vendors post-security, an art court, and both business and family lounges. The airport has also continued to expand its parking options, most recently in 2014.

On February 7, 2018, the airport announced a significant terminal modernization program, including replacement of existing jet bridges and design work beginning in 2018 as well as major construction including additional jet boarding bridges beginning in 2019.  The county is also planning to add an 8 MW solar energy site on airport-owned land.

In 2021, the airport began construction on an $85 million expansion of the terminal dubbed the South Terminal expansion. This project will add three additional gates that can accommodate larger aircraft. The new terminal will be two stories with 45,000 square feet of public space. The first floor will consist of 45,000 square feet of maintenance workshops and infrastructure. The concourse floor above will include the new gates, a restaurant, a play area for children, a nursing suite for mothers and a service animal relief area. This project has a completion date of July 2023 with updates having been provided in April 2022, and January 2023.

Facilities

Runways
Dane County Regional Airport covers 3,500 acres (1,416 ha) with a field elevation of 887 feet (270 m) above mean sea level. It has three concrete runways: 18/36 is 9,006 by 150 feet (2,745 x 46 m); 3/21 is 7,200 by 150 feet (2,195 x 46 m); 14/32 is 5,846 by 150 feet (1,782 x 46 m).

The fixed-base operator (FBO) is Wisconsin Aviation, which leased the assets of the former FBO, Four Lakes Aviation and Coldstream Aviation, in 1994.

In February 2023, there were 143 aircraft based at this airport: 81 single-engine, 10 multi-engine, 15 jet and 37 various military aircraft.

Terminal
The terminal currently has 13 gates on one concourse. Upon the completion of the South Terminal Expansion this will expand to 16 gates.

Pre-security amenities include a Coffee Shop and Gift Shop. The post-security side of the terminal includes two restaurants a coffee shop and two travel markets. The South Terminal expansion when complete will add an additional restaurant, a lactation room and a new post-security pet relief area.

Ground transportation
Taxi service and Transportation Network Company drivers (e.g. Uber and Lyft) are available outside the terminal. Rental car counters are located across from the baggage claim area. Many local hotels provide courtesy shuttle service to and from the airport.

Madison Metro serves the airport with Route 20 to the North Transfer Point or Madison Area Technical College / East Towne Mall.

Both short and long-term parking are available in a large parking structure and in several adjacent lots.

Airlines and destinations

Passenger

Cargo

Statistics

Airline market share

Top destinations

Passenger development

See also
 List of airports in Wisconsin
 List of intercity bus stops in Wisconsin
 Madison Metro

References

External links

 Dane County Regional Airport
 Wisconsin Airport Directory: Dane County Regional Airport (PDF)
 115th Fighter Wing, Wisconsin Air National Guard
 LiveATC.net: Class C airports - Listen live to Madison's Air Traffic Control
 
 

1943 establishments in Wisconsin
Airports established in 1943
Airports in Wisconsin
Buildings and structures in Dane County, Wisconsin
Buildings and structures in Madison, Wisconsin
Transportation in Madison, Wisconsin
Works Progress Administration in Wisconsin